István Szabó (born 15 June 1950) is a Hungarian sprint canoeist who competed from the early 1970s to the mid-1980s. Competing in three Summer Olympics, he won two medals in the K-2 1000 m event with a silver in 1980 and a bronze in 1976.

Szabó also won sixteen medals at the ICF Canoe Sprint World Championships with five golds (K-1 4 x 500 m: 1971, K-2 1000 m: 1974, 1977; K-2 10000 m: 1975, 1978), six silvers (K-2 1000 m: 1979, K-2 10000 m: 1977, 1981, 1983, 1985, K-4 10000 m: 1974), and five bronzes (K-2 1000 m: 1978, K-2 10000 m: 1982, K-4 1000 m: 1970, 1971, 1975).

References

External links
 
 

1950 births
Canoeists at the 1972 Summer Olympics
Canoeists at the 1976 Summer Olympics
Canoeists at the 1980 Summer Olympics
Hungarian male canoeists
Living people
Olympic canoeists of Hungary
Olympic silver medalists for Hungary
Olympic bronze medalists for Hungary
Olympic medalists in canoeing
ICF Canoe Sprint World Championships medalists in kayak
Medalists at the 1980 Summer Olympics
Medalists at the 1976 Summer Olympics
20th-century Hungarian people